Charley Lincoln (born Charlie Hicks, Jr., March 11, 1900 – September 28, 1963), also known as Laughing Charley, was an early American country blues musician. He often recorded with his brother Robert Hicks, who was billed as Barbecue Bob.

Life and career
Hicks was born in Lithonia, Georgia. In his teens he was taught to play the guitar by Savannah Weaver, the mother of Curley Weaver, and performed in the Lithonia area until 1920. He moved to Atlanta, Georgia, and worked outside the field of music, occasionally performing with his brother. He recorded with his brother for Columbia Records from 1927 to 1930. An example is the duet "It Won't Be Long Now", with crosstalk, which the brothers recorded in Atlanta on November 5, 1927.

After Robert's early death in 1931, Charley continued to perform into the 1950s, as Charley Lincoln. From 1955 to 1963 he was imprisoned for murder in Cairo, Georgia, where he became a prisoner trustee. He died there of a cerebral hemorrhage on September 28, 1963.

See also
List of blues musicians
List of country blues musicians
List of guitarists
List of nicknames of blues musicians
Yazoo Records

References

Sources
Harris, Sheldon (1994). Blues Who's Who. Rev ed. New York: Da Capo Press. .

1900 births
1963 deaths
African-American guitarists
Country blues singers
American blues guitarists
American male guitarists
Country blues musicians
Piedmont blues musicians
Singers from Georgia (U.S. state)
People from Lithonia, Georgia
20th-century American guitarists
Guitarists from Georgia (U.S. state)
20th-century African-American male singers